Vlastimil Picek (25 October 1956) is a Czech politician. He served as the Minister of Defence of the Czech Republic from March 2012 to January 2013. From 2007 to 2012, he was the Chief of the General Staff of the Armed Forces of the Czech Republic. He was the fourth person and the first member of Czech Air Force to serve at this position. He was appointed by President Václav Klaus and took office on 1 March 2007. He was replaced by Major General Petr Pavel as from 1 July 2012. On 18 September 2012 he was appointed the 1st Deputy Defence Minister. On 13 December 2012, he was dismissed by then new minister Karolína Peake and on 21 December 2012 reinstalled by Prime Minister Petr Nečas, after Nečas dismissed Peake. In March, 2013, he was appointed Minister of Defence.

Personal background 
Picek is divorced and has one son. He enjoys tennis and skiing. He was a member of Communist Party of Czechoslovakia until 1990.

Education 
He graduated from Military Technical Secondary School in Nové Mesto nad Váhom in 1975. From 1976 to 1981 he studied at Military Academy in Brno. While studying at Military Academy, he attended two special courses, Internal study and internal study of intelligence. In 1993, Picek finished his postgraduate degree from Czech Technical University in Prague and in 1997 he finished the follow-on academic course of the General Staff at the Military Academy in Brno.

Career 
 1975 – 1978
 Senior radio operator
 1983 – 1986
 Deputy Battalion Commander for Technical Issues
 1986 – 1989
 Senior officer at the National Air Defence HQ
 1989 – 1993
 Head of HQ Group for AF and NAD
 1993 – 1994
 Chief of Signal Branch 4th Air Defence Corps HQ
 1994 – 1995
 Section Chief of the Signal Branch at the General Staff of ACR
 1995 – 1996
 Deputy Chief of the Signal Branch at the General Staff of ACR
 1996 – 1997
 Chief of the Signal Branch at the General Staff of ACR (GS)
 1997 – 2000
 Chief of the Operational-Tactical C2 Systems Department, GS
 2000 – 2001
 Chief of the ACR Signal Branch – Chief of the Command and Control Division, GS
 2001 – 2003
 Chief of the ACR Control and Command Division, GS – MoD Security Director
 1 May 2003 – 1 March 2007
 Chief of the Military Office of the President of the Czech Republic
 1 March 2007 – 30 June 2012
 Chief of the General Staff of Armed Forces of the Czech Republic
 18 September 2012 – 13 December 2012, 21 December 2012 – 19 March 2013
 1st Deputy Defence Minister
 19 March 2013 – 29 January 2014
 Minister of Defence of the Czech Republic
 since November 2014
 mayor of Brandýs nad Labem-Stará Boleslav

Dates of rank 
 Brigadier General: 14 March 2001
 Major General: 8 May 2003
 Lieutenant General: 8 May 2006
 Army General: 28 October 2009

Awards and decorations 

 Cross of Merit of the Minister of Defence 2nd and 3rd Grade
 ACR Medal 3rd Grade
 National Service Medal
 Medal for Merits in National Defence
 Honorary Commemorative Badge for Service in Peace Operation in the Balkans
 NATO 50th Anniversary Medal
 Honorary Commemorative ACR Badge of Premysl Otakar II, the Iron and Gold King

References

External links 
 
 Official biography

1956 births
Living people
Czech generals
Czech Technical University in Prague alumni
Recipients of the Legion of Honour
Defence ministers of the Czech Republic
People from Turnov
Communist Party of Czechoslovakia members
Mayors of places in the Czech Republic
Chiefs of the General Staff (Czech Republic)